Ctenjapyx is a genus of diplurans in the family Japygidae.

Species
 Ctenjapyx boneti Silvestri, 1948
 Ctenjapyx parkeri Smith, 1964

References

Diplura